Arthur Lewis Carnell (24 May 1909 – 31 August 1942) was an Australian rugby league footballer who played in the New South Wales Rugby League for North Sydney. He died during the Second World War.

Early life and rugby career
Carnell was born on 24 May 1909 in Dungog to parents Arthur Lewis and Regina Hessing Carnell. At the age of twenty-one in 1930, Carnell appeared 9 times for North Sydney as a fullback.

Personal life and military career
Carnell was married and worked as a soft goods salesman. He enlisted as a private in the Second Australian Imperial Force on 28 March 1940, and was posted to the 2/12th Infantry Battalion on 27 April. Whilst serving with the battalion in November 1940, Carnell was subject to a general court martial for being found outside his barracks without a leave pass, "disobeying a lawful command given by his superior officer", and "offering violence to his superior officer", for which he was found guilty on all counts and given detention for thirty days. He and his battalion participated in the North African campaign, and Carnell served during the Siege of Tobruk in 1941, during which he was promoted to lance corporal. The battalion was then given a rest period, during which Carnell was admitted to hospital and had his rank demoted to private upon his own request. The battalion was sent to New Guinea in August 1942, and Carnell saw combat during the Battle of Milne Bay, in which he was killed in action on 31 August 1942. Carnell was buried at Port Moresby (Bomana) War Cemetery.

Career statistics

References

1909 births
1942 deaths
Rugby league players from New South Wales
Australian rugby league players
Rugby league fullbacks
North Sydney Bears players
Salespeople
Australian Army personnel of World War II
Australian military personnel killed in World War II
People who were court-martialed
Australian Army soldiers
Burials at Port Moresby (Bomana) War Cemetery